Shekhawati is an Indo-Aryan language of north-eastern Rajasthan, India. It belongs to the Rajasthani languages and is spoken by an estimated three million people in the Shekhawati region, which comprises the  Churu, Jhunjhunu and Sikar districts.
 
A descriptive grammar of Shekhawati was published in 2001. The word order of the language is typically SOV, and the phonology is characterised by the presence of implosive consonants and a distinct high tone.

References

Languages of Rajasthan